Mohsenabad (also Romanized as Moḩsenābād) is a village in Gowhar Kuh Rural District, Nukabad District, Khash County, Sistan and Baluchestan Province, Iran. At the 2006 census, its population was 15, in 4 families.

References 

Populated places in Khash County